Peter Parrott (born 27 May 1936) is an Australian ice hockey player. He competed in the men's tournament at the 1960 Winter Olympics.

References

External links
 

1936 births
Australian ice hockey forwards
Ice hockey players at the 1960 Winter Olympics
Living people
Olympic ice hockey players of Australia
Place of birth missing (living people)
British emigrants to Australia